Simon Farnworth (born 28 October 1963 in Chorley, Lancashire) is an English former footballer who played as a goalkeeper. He played for Bolton Wanderers, Bury, Preston North End and Wigan Athletic, and made over 500 appearances during his career.

Simon retired from playing in 1996, and joined the backroom staff at Wigan as a physiotherapist. He then joined Liverpool, where he worked for eleven years as the head physio at Liverpool's academy. In 2009, he joined Morecambe and was appointed as the first-team physio.

In 1986 Farnworth became to date the last goalkeeper in English League football to play a match without wearing gloves, in Bolton Wanderers' 0–3 loss to Bristol City in The Frieght Rover Trophy Final at Wembley Stadium.

Simon has featured regularly in the Masters Football tournament, and has previously played for Wigan Athletic and Bolton Wanderers.

References

External links

1963 births
Living people
English footballers
Association football goalkeepers
English Football League players
Bolton Wanderers F.C. players
Stockport County F.C. players
Tranmere Rovers F.C. players
Bury F.C. players
Preston North End F.C. players
Wigan Athletic F.C. players
Wigan Athletic F.C. non-playing staff 
Liverpool F.C. non-playing staff
Morecambe F.C. non-playing staff 
Sportspeople from Chorley
Association football physiotherapists